Szabolcs Pásztor (10 September 1959 – 12 February 2022) was a Hungarian fencer. He competed in the individual and team épée events at the 1988 Summer Olympics. Pásztor died in February 2022, at the age of 62.

References

External links
 

1959 births
2022 deaths
Fencers at the 1988 Summer Olympics
Hungarian male épée fencers
Olympic fencers of Hungary
Sportspeople from Miskolc